Flavobacterium collinsii is a bacterium from the genus of Flavobacterium.

References

External links
Type strain of Flavobacterium collinsii at BacDive -  the Bacterial Diversity Metadatabase

collinsii
Bacteria described in 2016